Lucian Călin Cheţan (born 25 June 1985) is a Romanian former footballer who played as a defender or midfielder for various teams such as: Concordia Chiajna, Sportul Studențesc, Săgeata Năvodari or Mioveni, among others.

References

External links
 
 

1985 births
Living people
Sportspeople from Târgu Mureș
Romanian footballers
Association football defenders
Association football midfielders
Liga I players
FC Sportul Studențesc București players
Liga II players
FCM Câmpina players
CS Gaz Metan Mediaș players
CS Concordia Chiajna players
AFC Săgeata Năvodari players
CS Mioveni players